The Milwaukee Chiefs were a minor league professional ice hockey team in the International Hockey League from 1952 to 1954.

Season-by-season results

References 
Hockeydb.com Milwaukee Chiefs Statistics

International Hockey League (1945–2001) teams
Defunct ice hockey teams in the United States
Ice hockey clubs established in 1952
Ice hockey clubs disestablished in 1954
Ice hockey teams in Wisconsin
Sports in Milwaukee
1952 establishments in Wisconsin
1954 disestablishments in Wisconsin